"A Foreign Affair" is a song written and produced by Australian group Client Liaison, featuring Tina Arena. The song was released on 30 August 2017 as the fourth and final single from Client Liaison's debut studio album Diplomatic Immunity (2016).

The video was released on 29 August 2017 with Arena saying "It's been a lot of fun working with Client Liaison, from recording the song last summer and to crashing their set at Splendour, this clip ties it all together nicely! Grab a gin & tonic and get ready for take-off."

The song includes a lyrical allusion to Arena's own hit single "Sorrento Moon".

The Tim White directed video was nominated for Best Video at the ARIA Music Awards of 2017, losing out to "Moments" by Bliss n Eso..

At the J Awards of 2017, the song won the Australian Video of the Year.

Background 
Band member Monte Morgan told The West Australian it was during the writing of the song Tina Arena's "Sorrento Moon" was referenced with the lyric "as we kiss on the beach of Sorrento". "We developed the song and it had her style in it; the early 90s power ballad vibe". Morgan said he originally sang the entire song solo, but parts were "out of his register". Morgan has acknowledged that Client Liaison are "huge fans" of Arena and stated "Our manager actually reached out to her management and she came in and smashed it out in one take."

In July 2017, the group announced the A Foreign Affair World Tour, which began in August 2017. In July 2017, Client Liaison were performing at Splendour in the Grass when Arena joined them on stage for a surprise performance of "Sorento Moon". A music video for the track was filmed the following week  and the song released as a single on 30 August.

Reception
Kyle Butcher from Tone Deaf said "Soft balladry casts the song back into the mid-1980s synth-pop that bred artists like Eurogliders and Pseudo Echo, offering a chance for the melody and lyrics to tell the tale of a mile high foreign affair."

Mushroom said "["A Foreign Affair" is] a sexy track saturated in '80s tropes. From the thick dance beat with that classic gated reverb to edgy bass synths and swirling synth pads, this song is everything you thought you'd never hear in 2017 – and it works." Zoë Radas from Stack magazine called the song "the best track" on the album.

Music video 
The music video for the song was directed by Tim White and released on 29 August 2017. The video includes references to Australia’s former second airline Ansett Australia, which collapsed in 2001, in a tribute to the '80s sounds and looks that influence their style.

Zoë Radas from Stack magazine said the video is "sumptuous, hilarious and glowingly nostalgic all at once." Lucinda Price from Pedestrian said the video is "cinematically stunning".

Release history

References

2016 songs
2017 singles
Client Liaison songs
Tina Arena songs